Radio Stereo Alegre	Jinotepe		88.3
Radio La Buena Onda 	Jinotepe		91.1
Radio Eco Stereo	Jinotepe		92.9
Nuevo Tiempo	        Diriamba		98.9

Radio Stereo Romance	Jinotepe		105.3
Radio Stereo Sur	Jinotepe		106.9
Radio La Voz de Teresa	Santa Teresa     	1530

References 

Nicaragua
Stations
Radio stations